Enslavement of Beauty is a symphonic black metal  band from Norway. Enslavement of Beauty was formed in January 1995 by Ole Alexander Myrholt (vocals & lyrics) and Tony Eugene Tunheim (guitars & composing). The band spent the subsequent years composing and recording material and thereby developed their expression. In the summer of 1998, Enslavement of Beauty recorded the demo CD "Devilry & Temptation" which gained them a deal with Head Not Found/Voices of Wonder. This resulted in the 1999 release "Traces O' Red" which received very positive response. In November 2000, they recorded their second album, "Megalomania", accompanied by drummer Asgeir Mickelson (Borknagar/Spiral Architect) and bass player Hans-Aage Holmen. In 2007 the third album, "Mere Contemplations" has been released with the I.N.R.I. Unlimited label. Lyrically, Enslavement of Beauty is highly influenced by the works of William Shakespeare and Marquis de Sade.

Demo
1998 – Devilry and Temptation
All music by Tony Eugene Tunheim. Lyrics by Ole Alexander Myrholt, except for "Sonnet #CXLIV" by William Shakespeare.

Track listing
 The Masquerade of Rhapsody - 3:33
 Colleen - 1:54
 Sonnet #CXLIV - 4:26
 And to Temptation's Darkness Forever Abide - 5:59
 Scarlet - 3:38
Length 20:00

Albums 
Traces o' Red (Head Not Found, 1999)
Megalomania (Head Not Found, 2001)
Mere Contemplations (INRI Recordings, 2007)
The Perdition EP (2009)
And Still We Wither (compilation, 2018)

External links
Official MySpace page
INRI Unlimited

Norwegian symphonic black metal musical groups
Norwegian musical duos
Heavy metal duos
Musical groups established in 1995
1995 establishments in Norway

Musical groups from Norway with local place of origin missing